Castle River may refer to

New Zealand 
 Castle River (Marlborough), a tributary of the Awatere River
 Castle River (Southland), in Fiordland National Park
 Castle River (Wellington), a tributary of the Opouawe River, Southeast Wairarapa

Others 
 Castle Bruce River, a river on the Caribbean island of Dominica

See also 
 Castle (disambiguation)